One Town may refer to:

One Town, Eluru, a locality in Eluru, West Godavari district
One Town, Vijayawada, a locality in Vijayawada, Krishna district
One Town (Visakhapatnam), a locality in Visakhapatnam city